The University of Central Florida College of Arts and Humanities is an academic college of the University of Central Florida located in Orlando, Florida, United States. The dean of the college is Jeffrey Moore, M.M.

The College of Arts and Humanities was established in October 2005 after the College of Arts and Sciences was split into the College of Arts and Humanities and the College of Sciences. When Fernández was named dean of the new college in 2006, he became UCF's first Hispanic dean.

Organization
African-American Studies
English Department
Film Department
Florida Interactive Entertainment Academy (FIEA)
History Department
Interdisciplinary centers
Center for Humanities and Digital Research (CHDR)
Judaic Studies Program
Latin American Studies Program
Modern Languages Department
Music Department
Philosophy Department
School of Visual Arts and Design
Theatre Department
Women's Studies Program
Department of Writing and Rhetoric

Degrees
The college offers the following degrees:
 
Associate of Arts
Bachelor of Arts
Bachelor of Design in Architecture
Bachelor of Engineering Technology
Bachelor of Fine Arts
Bachelor of Science
Bachelor of Science in Business Administration
Bachelor of Science in Education
Bachelor of Science in Engineering
Bachelor of Science in Nursing
Bachelor of Science in Social Sciences

In addition, the college offers (as a joint program with the Rosen College of Hospitality Management) a Bachelor of Science degree in Entertainment Management.

References

External links
Official website

University of Central Florida College of Arts and Humanities
Arts and Humanities
Liberal arts colleges at universities in the United States
Educational institutions established in 2005
2005 establishments in Florida
Educational institutions established in 2006
2006 establishments in Florida